"Kalinka" is a song by the Danish dance-pop duo Infernal. It was released as the third single from their debut album, Infernal Affairs, in 1998. The song is based on the Russian Drobushki folk melody, and samples "Kalinka" by the Soviet Army Chorus & Band, directed by Boris Alexandrov and recorded in 1956 and 1963.

It has become Infernal's signature song from their early eurodance period (1997–2003), and when the song is performed at one of their concerts, they encourage the audience to perform the "kosak" dance.

Track listing

Credits and personnel
Music and lyrics written by Infernal
Lyrics performed by Søren Haahr and Lina Rafn
Produced, mixed and arranged by Infernal
Mastered by Michael Pfundheller
Executive producer: Kenneth Bager

Charts

External links
Kalinka at Discogs

1998 singles
Infernal (Danish band) songs
1998 songs
Songs written by Paw Lagermann
Songs written by Lina Rafn
Russian folk music